Degelia cyanoloma is a species of blue-grey to lead-grey foliose lichen in the genus Degelia. It mostly grows on mossy trees in undisturbed woodlands. It is found in the Scottish Highlands, western Ireland and Norway (as well as less prolifically in Spain, France and Portugal), as it grows in maritime Atlantic climates.

Degelia cyanoloma was previously thought to be a variant of Degelia plumbea.

References

Peltigerales
Lichen species
Lichens of Europe